John MacLeod of MacLeod, (born John Wolrige-Gordon; 10 August 1935 – 12 February 2007) was the 29th Chief of Clan MacLeod. Faced with the need for expensive repairs to the clan's seat at Dunvegan Castle on the Isle of Skye, his proposed methods to raise funds caused considerable controversy. His twin brother, Patrick Wolridge-Gordon (1935–2002), was MP for East Aberdeenshire.

Biography
John was born as John Wolrige-Gordon in Ellon, Aberdeenshire, on 10 August 1935. He was the elder of the twin sons of Captain Robert Wolrige-Gordon, MC and his wife Joan Walter. His mother, Joan, was the daughter of Dame Flora MacLeod of MacLeod, the 28th Chief of Clan MacLeod. His younger twin brother, Patrick Wolrige-Gordon, would later become a Tory Member of Parliament. The twins had an older brother, Robert Wolrige-Gordon, who would later succeed their father as the 21st Laird of Hallhead, 10th Baron of Esslemont.

John was educated at Eton College, McGill University, and the London Academy of Music and Dramatic Art. He started a career in acting and singing after National Service in the Black Watch Regiment.

In 1951, he was named heir to his grandmother, changed his surname to MacLeod of MacLeod, and was recognised by the Lord Lyon King of Arms as John MacLeod of MacLeod, Younger. He matriculated arms at Lyon Office in 1962. He later succeeded as Chief of Clan MacLeod in 1976. In 2000, faced with the high cost of repairs to Dunvegan Castle, his clan's seat for more than 800 years, he put the Black Cuillin range in Skye on the market for £10 million. He also planned to build an 80-bedroom hotel on his Skye estate with the proceeds of the sale. The planned sale caused outrage at the time and was never completed. He had also considered transferring the range to a charitable trust for public ownership.

Family
John married Drusilla Mary Shaw on 25 July 1961. The marriage was later dissolved by divorce, without issue, on 31 March 1971. He also had a natural son, Stephan, born in 1971. On 19 March 1973, he married Azima Melita Kolin, daughter of Duko Kolin of Sofia. The couple had two children, Hugh Magnus and Elena Mary Nadezhda, born in 1973 and 1977, respectively. His second marriage was also dissolved by divorce on 28 August 1992. On 27 March 2004, he married Ulrika Thram.

Cricket
During the 1980s, John became a keen playing member of the Poet's and Peasants' Cricket Club, a group of amateurs (largely musicians) that included founding member Bramwell Tovey. The club's poet was Alan Gibson, The Times cricket correspondent and former Test Match Special commentator. Such was John's modesty that few of the members knew about his background until a piece appeared about him in one of the Sunday broadsheets. John was by all accounts a decent batsman and would usually open the batting for the Peasants with a statuesque West Indian named Tony Jenkins who drove trains on London's Central Line. The club was based in Essex and most of the fixtures were played in this county - some considerable distance from John's London home in Chelsea.

Death and successor
On 12 February 2007, John died of leukaemia, aged 71, in London, England. His funeral was held at Duirinish Free Church of Scotland, at Dunvegan. He was buried at the ruined stone church at Kilmuir. John was succeeded by his second son, Hugh Magnus MacLeod, as 30th Chief of Clan MacLeod.

Ancestry

Heraldry

References

1935 births
2007 deaths
Alumni of the London Academy of Music and Dramatic Art
Black Watch officers
Deaths from cancer in England
John
Deaths from leukemia
McGill University alumni
People educated at Eton College
People from Ellon, Aberdeenshire
People from the Isle of Skye
20th-century Scottish businesspeople